Lieutenant Robert MacIntyre Gordon (30 September 1899 – 19 April 1983) was a Glasgow-born seventeen-year-old World War I flying ace. He was credited with nine aerial victories as a Sopwith Camel pilot for the Royal Naval Air Service in 1918. Postwar, he became a medical doctor.

Early life
Robert MacIntyre Gordon was born in Queen's Park, Glasgow, Scotland on 30 September 1899.

World War I
During World War I, Gordon became a Sopwith Camel fighter pilot for 4 Squadron of the Royal Naval Air Service. He remained with this unit when it was incorporated into the Royal Air Force as 204 Squadron. Between 30 June and 27 October 1918, he scored nine aerial victories and won a Distinguished Flying Cross for his bravery. His DFC was gazetted on 2 November 1918:

On 29 September 1918, he was wounded and hospitalized. Freed from bed rest in early October, he was sent on leave. Upon return to duty, he scored his last victory on 27 October but was wounded again in the process. He sat out the rest of the war.

Combat record

Post World War I
Gordon qualified as a doctor in 1924.  He was awarded a DSO and GM for his service during World War II. He died on 19 April 1983.

Endnotes

References
 

British World War I flying aces
Scottish flying aces
Military personnel from Glasgow
1899 births
1983 deaths
Companions of the Distinguished Service Order
Royal Naval Air Service aviators
Recipients of the Distinguished Flying Cross (United Kingdom)